The 2002 Copa del Rey Juvenil was the 52nd staging of the tournament. The competition began on May 22, 2002 and ended on June 29, 2002 with the final.

First round

|}

Quarterfinals

|}

Semifinals

|}

Final

Copa del Rey Juvenil de Fútbol
Juvenil